Stäbler or Staebler is a German occupational surname, which means an official who carries a staff as a symbol of office, from the Middle High German stebelære. The name may refer to:

Barbara Stäbler, Swiss judo competitor
David L. Staebler (born 1940), American electrical engineer
Edna Staebler (1906–2006), Canadian writer
Edward W. Staebler (1872-1946), Michigan politician
Frank Stäbler (born 1989), German wrestler
Gerhard Stäbler (born 1949), German composer
Helen Waimel Staebler Robertson (1917-2002), Estonian-Canadian sculptor
 Horst Stäbler, German driver at the 1996 BPR 4 Hours of Nürburgring
Jacob Staebler (1846–1906), Canadian politician
Jason Staebler, a character in The King of Marvin Gardens
Karl Stäbler, German communist resistance operative with Else Himmelheber
Michael Staebler (born 1843), builder of the Germania Building Complex in Ann Arbor, MI
Neil Staebler (1905–2000), American politician
Rainer Stäbler, management board member of Versandhaus Walz
Robby Staebler, member of American rock band All Them Witches
Stephen De Staebler (1933–2011), American sculptor

Other uses
Edna Staebler Award, a Canadian literary award
Staebler–Wronski effect
Moravian Anabaptist faction c. 1527
Bus transport company operating in Stuttgart

See also
Stabler
Stebler
Stäbler (coin)

References 

German-language surnames
Occupational surnames
Surnames of German origin
German words and phrases